De Land may refer to:

Places
 De Land, a village in Illinois
 DeLand, a city in Florida